Holy person may refer to:

 One of the three "Persons" of the Holy Trinity in Christianity
 A saint or other pious person